Blue Sky Bones, also known as The Blue Bone, is a 2013 Chinese music film directed by Cui Jian. It was released in China on October 17, 2014.

Cast
Zhao Youliang
Ni Hongjie
Yin Fang
Huang Xuan
Huang Huan
Guo Jinglin
Lei Han
Tao Ye
Mao Amin

Reception
By October 20, the film had earned ¥3.02 million at the Chinese box office.

References

External links

2010s musical drama films
Chinese musical drama films